Melville Cole Armstrong (born August 24, 1983) is a Canadian former professional baseball catcher and current manager for the Kamloops NorthPaws, who has played in international competition with the Canada national baseball team.

Career
While attending high school at Delphi Academy in Langley, British Columbia, Armstrong played multiple seasons for the Whalley Chiefs of the B.C. Premier Baseball League.  He played for Canada at the 2000 World Junior Baseball Championship in Sherbrooke, Quebec.

Armstrong, who also played at Chipola (Fla.) Junior College, was drafted by the New York Mets in the 32nd Round of 2001 Draft but did not sign. He was drafted again by the Atlanta Braves in the 12th round (487th overall) of the 2003 Major League Baseball Draft. He played one year for the University of Kansas Jayhawks in  before entering the Minor League.

He split parts of the next two seasons between the Winston-Salem Warthogs and the Birmingham Barons.

He re-signed with Chicago on Feb. 27, 2008 for a one-year deal and signed another one-year contract for $400,000 with the White Sox on Feb. 24, 2009. Halfway through the  season, Armstrong was promoted to the Triple-A Charlotte Knights where he remained through the  season.

Armstrong was designated for assignment on January 12, 2010.

On January 19, 2010, Cole was out-righted to Triple-A Charlotte. He finished the 2010 season with the Birmingham Barons.

He joined the Los Angeles Angels of Anaheim organization in 2011 and was assigned to the Triple-A Salt Lake City Bees.

Armstrong became a coach with the AZL White Sox in 2014.

References

External links

1983 births
Living people
Águilas Cibaeñas players
Canadian expatriate baseball players in the Dominican Republic
Baseball catchers
Baseball people from British Columbia
Baseball players at the 2011 Pan American Games
Birmingham Barons players
Canada national baseball team players
Canadian baseball coaches
Canadian expatriate baseball players in the United States
Charlotte Knights players
Danville Braves players
Gulf Coast Braves players
Minor league baseball coaches
Minor league baseball managers
New Orleans Zephyrs players
Pan American Games gold medalists for Canada
Pan American Games medalists in baseball
Rome Braves players
Salt Lake Bees players
Sportspeople from Surrey, British Columbia
Kansas Jayhawks baseball players
Wichita Wingnuts players
Winston-Salem Warthogs players
Medalists at the 2011 Pan American Games
Chipola Indians baseball players
Mat-Su Miners players